The St. Charles City-County Library is made up of eleven library branches located throughout St. Charles County in east-central Missouri (United States of America). These libraries serve the residents of St. Charles County, and branches host nearly two million visitors per year.

The Library was established on August 1, 1973 when the Kathryn Linnemann Library of St. Charles merged with the St. Charles County Library District.  It is governed by a board of trustees, and funded primarily through property taxes.

Branches

Collections 
The St. Charles City-County Library circulates over 5.5 million items per year. Its branches loan books, music, magazines, movies, audiobooks, video games, and alternative materials.  Some of the library’s more unusual items for check-out include cake pans, fitness kits, kitchen equipment, talking books for children, book discussion kits, and telescopes. The library also offers electronic books, magazines, music, audiobooks and a wide variety of research resources that can be downloaded or streamed from an internet-connected device in a customer’s home.

Services 
In addition to library materials, the St. Charles City-County Library provides events and classes for the community. Customers can attend book discussion groups, children’s story times, teen events, crafting classes, author visits, technology training, themed events, game nights, concerts, and participate in a summer reading program for all ages. The combined eleven branches offer over 6,000 different events each year.

The St. Charles City-County Library also offers outreach services to those in the community that may not be able to access its branches. Library staff provide programming and library materials to nursing homes, retirement communities, schools, day care centers, the homebound, and the incarcerated.

Customers can access gathering places for community groups, business meetings, recreational groups, and informal gatherings. Most branches offer rooms for reserve and all branches have public computers and study spaces.

References 

Public libraries in Missouri
Buildings and structures in St. Charles County, Missouri
1973 establishments in Missouri
Libraries established in 1973